1,2,4-Trioxane is one of the isomers of trioxane. It has the molecular formula CHO and consists of a six membered ring with three carbon atoms and three oxygen atoms. The two adjacent oxygen atoms form a peroxide functional group and the other forms an ether functional group. It is like a cyclic acetal but with one of the oxygen atoms in the acetal group being replaced by a peroxide group.

1,2,4-Trioxane itself has not been isolated or characterized, but rather only studied computationally. However, it constitutes an important structural element of some more complex organic compounds. The natural compound artemisinin, isolated from the sweet wormwood plant (Artemisia annua), and some semi-synthetic derivatives are important antimalarial drugs containing the 1,2,4-trioxane ring. Completely synthetic analogs containing the 1,2,4-trioxane ring are important potential improvements over the naturally derived artemisinins. The peroxide group in the 1,2,4-trioxane core of artemisinin is cleaved in the presence of the malaria parasite leading to reactive oxygen radicals that are damaging to the parasite.

References

Organic peroxides
Trioxanes
Hypothetical chemical compounds